Hair:  The American Tribal Love-Rock Musical is a rock musical with a book and lyrics by Gerome Ragni and James Rado and music by Galt MacDermot. The work reflects the creators' observations of the hippie counterculture and sexual revolution of the late 1960s, and several of its songs became anthems of the anti-Vietnam War peace movement. The musical's profanity, its depiction of the use of illegal drugs, its treatment of sexuality, its irreverence for the American flag, and its nude scene caused much comment and controversy. The work broke new ground in musical theatre by defining the genre of "rock musical", using a racially integrated cast, and inviting the audience onstage for a "Be-In" finale.

Hair tells the story of the "tribe", a group of politically active, long-haired hippies of the "Age of Aquarius" living a bohemian life in New York City and fighting against conscription into the Vietnam War.  Claude, his good friend Berger, their roommate Sheila and their friends struggle to balance their young lives, loves, and the sexual revolution with their rebellion against the war and their conservative parents and society.  Ultimately, Claude must decide whether to resist the draft as his friends have done, or to serve in Vietnam, compromising his pacifist principles and risking his life.

After an off-Broadway debut on October 17, 1967, at Joseph Papp's Public Theater and a run at the Cheetah nightclub from December 1967 through January 1968, the show opened on Broadway in April 1968 and ran for 1,750 performances.  Simultaneous productions in cities across the United States and Europe followed shortly thereafter, including a successful London production that ran for 1,997 performances. Since then, numerous productions have been staged around the world, spawning dozens of recordings of the musical, including the 3 million-selling original Broadway cast recording. Some of the songs from its score became Top 10 hits, and a feature film adaptation was released in 1979. A Broadway revival opened in 2009, earning strong reviews and winning the Tony Award and Drama Desk Award for Best Revival of a Musical. In 2008, Time wrote, "Today Hair seems, if anything, more daring than ever."

History 
Hair was conceived by actors James Rado and Gerome Ragni.  The two met in 1964 when they performed together in the Off-Broadway flop Hang Down Your Head and Die, and they began writing Hair together in late 1964.  The main characters were autobiographical, with Rado's Claude being a pensive romantic and Ragni's Berger an extrovert.  Their close relationship, including its volatility, was reflected in the musical.  Rado explained, "We were great friends.  It was a passionate kind of relationship that we directed into creativity, into writing, into creating this piece.  We put the drama between us on stage."

Rado described the inspiration for Hair as "a combination of some characters we met in the streets, people we knew and our own imaginations. We knew this group of kids in the East Village who were dropping out and dodging the draft, and there were also lots of articles in the press about how kids were being kicked out of school for growing their hair long".  He recalled, "There was so much excitement in the streets and the parks and the hippie areas, and we thought if we could transmit this excitement to the stage it would be wonderful. ... We hung out with them and went to their Be-Ins [and] let our hair grow."  Many cast members (Shelley Plimpton in particular) were recruited right off the street. Rado said, "It was very important historically, and if we hadn't written it, there'd not be any examples.  You could read about it and see film clips, but you'd never experience it. We thought, 'This is happening in the streets', and we wanted to bring it to the stage." According to Rado's obituary in The New York Times, the title was inspired by "a museum stroll in mid-1965, [when he and Ragni saw] a painting of a tuft of hair by the Pop artist Jim Dine. Its title was 'Hair'."

Rado and Ragni came from different artistic backgrounds. In college, Rado wrote musical revues and aspired to be a Broadway composer in the Rodgers and Hammerstein tradition.  He went on to study acting with Lee Strasberg.  Ragni, on the other hand, was an active member of The Open Theater, one of several groups, mostly Off-off Broadway, that were developing experimental theatre techniques.  He introduced Rado to the modern theatre styles and methods being developed at The Open Theater.  In 1966, while the two were developing Hair, Ragni performed in The Open Theater's production of Megan Terry's play Viet Rock, a story about young men being deployed to the Vietnam War. In addition to the war theme, Viet Rock employed the improvisational exercises being used in the experimental theatre scene and later used in the development of Hair.

Rado and Ragni brought their drafts of the show to producer Eric Blau who, through common friend Nat Shapiro, connected the two with Canadian composer Galt MacDermot. MacDermot had won a Grammy Award in 1961 for his composition "African Waltz" (recorded by Cannonball Adderley).  The composer's lifestyle was in marked contrast to his co-creators: "I had short hair, a wife, and, at that point, four children, and I lived on Staten Island."  "I never even heard of a hippie when I met Rado and Ragni."  But he shared their enthusiasm to do a rock and roll show.  "We work independently", explained MacDermot in May 1968.  "I prefer it that way.  They hand me the material.  I set it to music."  MacDermot wrote the first score in three weeks, starting with the songs "I Got Life", "Ain't Got No", "Where Do I Go" and the title song.  He first wrote "Aquarius" as an unconventional art piece, but later rewrote it into an uplifting anthem.

Off-Broadway productions 
The creators pitched the show to Broadway producers and received many rejections. Eventually Joe Papp, who ran the New York Shakespeare Festival, decided he wanted Hair to open the new Public Theater (still under construction) in New York City's East Village. The musical was the first work by living authors that Papp produced. The director, Gerald Freedman, the theater's associate artistic director, decided that Rado, at 35, was too old to play Claude, although he agreed to cast the 32-year-old Ragni as Berger. The production did not go smoothly: "The rehearsal and casting process was confused, the material itself incomprehensible to many of the theater's staff. [Freedman] withdrew in frustration during the final week of rehearsals and offered his resignation. Papp accepted it, and the choreographer Anna Sokolow took over the show. ... After a disastrous final dress rehearsal, Papp wired Mr. Freedman in Washington, where he'd fled: 'Please come back.'  Mr. Freedman did."

Hair premiered off-Broadway at the Public on October 17, 1967, and ran for a limited engagement of six weeks. The lead roles were played by Walker Daniels as Claude, Ragni as Berger, Jill O'Hara as Sheila, Steve Dean as Woof, Arnold Wilkerson as Hud, Sally Eaton as Jeanie and Shelley Plimpton as Crissy. Set design was by Ming Cho Lee, costume design by Theoni Aldredge, and, although Anna Sokolow began rehearsals as choreographer, Freedman received choreographer credit. Although the production had a "tepid critical reception", it was popular with audiences. A cast album was released in 1967.

Chicago businessman Michael Butler was planning to run for the U.S. Senate on an anti-war platform. After seeing an ad for Hair in The New York Times that led him to believe the show was about Native Americans, he watched the Public's production several times and joined forces with Joe Papp to reproduce the show at another New York venue after the close of its run at the Public. Papp and Butler first moved the show to The Cheetah, a discothèque at 53rd Street and Broadway. It opened there on December 22, 1967, and ran for 45 performances. There was no nudity in either the Public Theater or Cheetah production.

Revision for Broadway 
Hair underwent a thorough overhaul between its closing at the Cheetah in January 1968 and its Broadway opening three months later. The off-Broadway book, already light on plot, was loosened even further and made more realistic.  were added, including "Let the Sun Shine In", to make the ending more uplifting.

Before the move to Broadway, the creative team hired director Tom O'Horgan, who had built a reputation directing experimental theater at the La MaMa Experimental Theatre Club.  He had been the authors' first choice to direct the Public Theater production, but he was in Europe at the time.  Newsweek described O'Horgan's directing style as "sensual, savage, and thoroughly musical ... [he] disintegrates verbal structure and often breaks up and distributes narrative and even character among different actors. ... He enjoys sensory bombardment."  In rehearsals, O'Horgan used techniques passed down by Viola Spolin and Paul Sills involving role playing and improvisational "games".  Many of the improvisations tried during this process were incorporated into the Broadway script. O'Horgan and new choreographer Julie Arenal encouraged freedom and spontaneity in their actors, introducing "an organic, expansive style of staging" that had never been seen before on Broadway.  The inspiration to include nudity came when the authors saw an anti-war demonstration in Central Park where two men stripped naked as an expression of defiance and freedom, and they decided to incorporate the idea into the show.  O'Horgan had used nudity in many of the plays he directed, and he helped integrate the idea into the fabric of the show.

Papp declined to pursue a Broadway production, and so Butler produced the show himself.  For a time it seemed that Butler would be unable to secure a Broadway theater, as the Shuberts, Nederlanders and other theater owners deemed the material too controversial. However, Butler had family connections and knew important people; he persuaded Biltmore Theatre owner David Cogan to make his venue available.

Synopsis

Act I 
Claude sits center stage as the "tribe" mingles with the audience. Tribe members Sheila, a New York University student who is a determined political activist, and Berger, an irreverent free spirit, cut a lock of Claude's hair and burn it in a receptacle.  After the tribe converges in slow-motion toward the stage, through the audience, they begin their celebration as children of the Age of Aquarius ("Aquarius").  Berger removes his trousers to reveal a loincloth.  Interacting with the audience, he introduces himself as a "psychedelic teddy bear" and reveals that he is "looking for my Donna" ("Donna").

The tribe recites a list of pharmaceuticals, legal and illegal ("Hashish").  Woof, a gentle soul, extols several sexual practices ("Sodomy") and says, "I grow things."  He loves plants, his family and the audience, telling the audience, "We are all one."  Hud, a militant African-American, is carried in upside down on a pole.  He declares himself "president of the United States of Love" ("Colored Spade"). In a fake English accent, Claude says that he is "the most beautiful beast in the forest" from "Manchester, England". A tribe member reminds him that he's really from Flushing, New York ("Manchester England"). Hud, Woof and Berger declare what color they are ("I'm Black"), while Claude says that he's "invisible". The tribe recites a list of things they lack ("Ain't Got No").  Four African-American tribe members recite street signs in symbolic sequence ("Dead End").

Sheila is carried onstage ("I Believe in Love") and leads the tribe in a protest chant. Jeanie, an eccentric young woman, appears wearing a gas mask, satirizing pollution ("Air").  She is pregnant and in love with Claude.  Although she wishes it was Claude's baby, she was "knocked up by some crazy speed freak". The tribe link together LBJ (President Lyndon B. Johnson), FBI (the Federal Bureau of Investigation), CIA (the Central Intelligence Agency) and LSD ("Initials"). Six members of the tribe appear dressed as Claude's parents, berating him for his various transgressions – he does not have a job, and he collects "mountains of paper" clippings and notes. They say that they will not give him any more money, and "the army'll make a man out of you", presenting him with his draft notice. In defiance, Claude leads the tribe in celebrating their vitality ("I Got Life").

After handing out imaginary pills to the tribe members, saying the pills are for high-profile people such as Richard Nixon, the Pope, and "Alabama Wallace", Berger relates how he was expelled from high school. Three tribe members dress up as principals in Hitler mustaches and swastika arm bands, mocking the American education system. Berger and the tribe defy them, singing "Going Down".  Claude returns from his draft board physical, which he passed.  He pretends to burn his Vietnam War draft card, which Berger reveals as a library card.  Claude agonizes about what to do about being drafted.

Two tribe members dressed as tourists come down the aisle to ask the tribe why they have such long hair. In answer, Claude and Berger lead the tribe in explaining the significance of their locks ("Hair"). The woman states that kids should "be free, no guilt" and should "do whatever you want, just so long as you don't hurt anyone."  She observes that long hair is natural, like the "elegant plumage" of male birds ("My Conviction"). She opens her coat to reveal that she's a man in drag.  As the couple leaves, the tribe calls her Margaret Mead.

Sheila gives Berger a yellow shirt. He goofs around and ends up tearing it in two.  Sheila voices her distress that Berger seems to care more about the "bleeding crowd" than about her ("Easy to Be Hard").  Jeanie summarizes everyone's romantic entanglements: "I'm hung up on Claude, Sheila's hung up on Berger, Berger is hung up everywhere. Claude is hung up on a cross over Sheila and Berger." Berger, Woof and another tribe member pay satiric tribute to the American flag as they fold it ("Don't Put it Down").  The tribe runs out to the audience, inviting them to a Be-In. After young and innocent Crissy describes "Frank Mills", a boy she's looking for, the tribe participates in the "Be-In". The men of the tribe burn their draft cards.  Claude puts his card in the fire, then changes his mind and pulls it out.  He asks, "where is the something, where is the someone, that tells me why I live and die?" ("Where Do I Go").  The tribe emerges naked, intoning "beads, flowers, freedom, happiness."

Act II 
Four tribe members have the "Electric Blues".  After a black-out, the tribe enters worshiping in an attempt to summon Claude ("Oh Great God of Power"). Claude returns from the induction center, and tribe members act out an imagined conversation from Claude's draft interview, with Hud saying "the draft is white people sending black people to make war on the yellow people to defend the land they stole from the red people".  Claude gives Woof a Mick Jagger poster, and Woof is excited about the gift, as he has said he's hung up on Jagger.  Three white women of the tribe tell why they like "Black Boys" ("black boys are delicious ..."), and three black women of the tribe, dressed like The Supremes, explain why they like "White Boys" ("white boys are so pretty ...").

Berger gives a joint to Claude that is laced with a hallucinogen.  Claude starts to trip as the tribe acts out his visions ("Walking in Space").  He hallucinates that he is skydiving from a plane into the jungles of Vietnam.  Berger appears as General George Washington and is told to retreat because of an Indian attack. The Indians shoot all of Washington's men.  General Ulysses S. Grant appears and begins a roll call: Abraham Lincoln (played by a black female tribe member), John Wilkes Booth, Calvin Coolidge, Clark Gable, Scarlett O'Hara, Aretha Franklin, Colonel George Custer.  Claude Bukowski is called in the roll call, but Clark Gable says "he couldn't make it".  They all dance a minuet until three African witch doctors kill them – all except for Abraham Lincoln who says, "I'm one of you".  Lincoln, after the three Africans sing his praises, recites an alternate version of the Gettysburg Address ("Abie Baby").  Booth shoots Lincoln, but Lincoln says to him, "Shit! I'm not dyin' for no white man".

As the visions continue, four Buddhist monks enter.  One monk pours a can of gasoline over another monk, who is set afire (reminiscent of the self-immolation of Thích Quảng Đức) and runs off screaming. Three Catholic nuns strangle the three remaining Buddhist monks. Three astronauts shoot the nuns with ray guns.  Three Chinese people stab the astronauts with knives.  Three Native Americans kill the Chinese with bows and tomahawks. Three green berets kill the Native Americans with machine guns and then kill each other.  A Sergeant and two parents appear holding up a suit on a hanger.  The parents talk to the suit as if it is their son and they are very proud of him.  The bodies rise and play like children.  The play escalates to violence until they are all dead again. They rise again and comment about the casualties in Vietnam: "It's a dirty little war" ("Three-Five-Zero-Zero"). At the end of the trip sequence, two tribe members sing, over the dead bodies, a Shakespeare speech about the nobility of Man ("What A Piece of Work Is Man"), set to music. 

After the trip, Claude says "I can't take this moment to moment living on the streets. ... I know what I want to be ... invisible".  As they "look at the moon," Sheila and the others enjoy a light moment ("Good Morning Starshine").  The tribe pays tribute to an old mattress ("The Bed"). Claude is left alone with his doubts.  He leaves as the tribe enters wrapped in blankets in the midst of a snow storm.  They start a protest chant and then wonder where Claude has gone.  Berger calls out "Claude! Claude!"  Claude enters dressed in a military uniform, his hair short, but they do not see him because he is an invisible spirit.  Claude says, "like it or not, they got me."

Claude and everyone sing "Flesh Failures".  The tribe moves in front of Claude as Sheila and Dionne take up the lyric.  The whole tribe launches into "Let the Sun Shine In", and as they exit, they reveal Claude lying down center stage on a black cloth.  During the curtain call, the tribe reprises "Let the Sun Shine In" and brings audience members up on stage to dance.

(Note: This plot summary is based on the original Broadway script.  The script has varied in subsequent productions.)

Principal roles; original Off-Broadway and Broadway casts
Claude Hooper Bukowski – Walker Daniels / James Rado
George Berger – Gerome Ragni
Sheila Franklin – Jill O'Hara / Lynn Kellogg  
Jeanie – Sally Eaton
Neil "Woof" Donovan – Steve Dean / Steve Curry
Hud – Arnold Wilkerson / Lamont Washington
Crissy – Shelley Plimpton
The original Broadway production also included Melba Moore as Dionne, Ronnie Dyson, Paul Jabara and Diane Keaton.

Early productions

Broadway 
Hair opened on Broadway at the Biltmore Theatre on April 29, 1968.  The production was directed by Tom O'Horgan and choreographed by Julie Arenal, with set design by Robin Wagner, costume design by Nancy Potts, and lighting design by Jules Fisher.  The original Broadway "tribe" (i.e., cast) included authors Rado and Ragni, who played the lead roles of Claude and Berger, respectively, Kellogg as Sheila, Washington as Hud, Eaton and Plimpton reprising their off-Broadway roles as Jeanie and Crissy, Moore as Dionne, Curry as Woof, Dyson (who sang "Aquarius" and "What a Piece of Work is Man"), Jabara and Keaton (both Moore and Keaton later played Sheila). Among the performers who appeared in Hair during its original Broadway run were Ben Vereen, Keith Carradine, Barry McGuire, Ted Lange, Meat Loaf, La La Brooks, Mary Seymour (of Musique), Joe Butler, Peppy Castro (of the Blues Magoos), Robin McNamara, Heather MacRae (daughter of Gordon MacRae and Sheila MacRae), Eddie Rambeau, Vicki Sue Robinson, Beverly Bremers, Dale Soules and Kim Milford. It was the first Broadway show to have a regular ticket price of $50, with 12 of the seats at this price for sale to large corporations from July 1968. The top price when it opened was $11.

The Hair team soon became embroiled in a lawsuit with the organizers of the Tony Awards. After assuring producer Michael Butler that commencing previews by April 3, 1968, would assure eligibility for consideration for the 1968 Tonys, the New York Theatre League ruled Hair ineligible, moving the cutoff date to March 19.  The producers brought suit but were unable to force the League to reconsider.  At the 1969 Tonys, Hair was nominated for Best Musical and Best Director but lost out to 1776 in both categories.  The production ran for four years and 1,750 performances, closing on July 1, 1972.

Early regional productions 
The West Coast version played at the Aquarius Theater in Los Angeles beginning about six months after the Broadway opening and running for an unprecedented two years. The Los Angeles tribe included Rado, Ragni, Ben Vereen (who replaced Ragni), Willie Weatherly (who played Berger and Claude), Ted Neeley (who replaced Rado), Meat Loaf, Gloria Jones, Táta Vega, Jobriath, Jennifer Warnes and Dobie Gray.

There were soon nine simultaneous productions in U.S. cities, followed by national tours.  Among the performers in these were Joe Mantegna, André DeShields, and Alaina Reed (Chicago), David Lasley, David Patrick Kelly, Meat Loaf, and Shaun Murphy (Detroit) Arnold McCuller (tour), Bob Bingham (Seattle) and Philip Michael Thomas (San Francisco).  The creative team from Broadway worked on Hair in Los Angeles, Chicago and San Francisco, as the Broadway staging served as a rough template for these and other early regional productions.  A notable addition to the team in Los Angeles was Tom Smothers, who served as co-producer. Regional casts consisted mostly of local actors, although a few Broadway cast members reprised their roles in other cities.  O'Horgan or the authors sometimes took new ideas and improvisations from a regional show and brought them back to New York, such as when live chickens were tossed onto the stage in Los Angeles.

It was rare for so many productions to run simultaneously during an initial Broadway run.  Producer Michael Butler, who had declared that Hair is "the strongest anti-war statement ever written", said the reason that he opened so many productions was to influence public opinion against the Vietnam War and end it as soon as possible.

West End 
Hair opened at the Shaftesbury Theatre in London on September 27, 1968, led by the same creative team as the Broadway production. The opening night was delayed until the abolition of theatre censorship in England under the Theatres Act 1968 so that the show could include nudity and profanity. As with other early productions, the London show added a sprinkling of local allusions and other minor departures from the Broadway version.

The original London tribe included Sonja Kristina, Peter Straker, Paul Nicholas, Melba Moore, Annabel Leventon, Elaine Paige, Paul Korda, Marsha Hunt, Floella Benjamin, Alex Harvey, Oliver Tobias, Richard O'Brien and Tim Curry. This was Curry's first full-time theatrical acting role, where he met future Rocky Horror Show collaborator O'Brien. Hairs engagement in London surpassed the Broadway production, running for 1,997 performances until its closure was forced by the roof of the theatre collapsing in July 1973.

Early international productions 
The job of leading the foreign language productions of Hair was given to Bertrand Castelli, Butler's partner and executive producer of the Broadway show.  Castelli was a writer/producer who traveled in Paris art circles and rubbed elbows with Pablo Picasso and Jean Cocteau.  Butler described him as a "crazy showman ... the guy with the business suit and beads".  Castelli decided to do the show in the local language of each country at a time when Broadway shows were always done in English.  The translations followed the original script closely, and the Broadway stagings were used.  Each script contained local references, such as street names and the names or depictions of local politicians and celebrities.  Castelli produced companies in France, Germany, Mexico and other countries, sometimes also directing the productions. The first European production opened in Stockholm, Sweden, on September 20, 1968, with a cast including Ulf Brunnberg and Bill Öhrström, produced and directed by Pierre Fränckel and choreographed by Julie Arenal, and ran for 134 performances until March 1969.

A German production, directed by Castelli, opened a month later in Munich; the tribe included Donna Summer, Liz Mitchell and Donna Wyant.  A successful Parisian production of Hair opened on June 1, 1969.  The original Australian production premiered in Sydney on June 6, 1969, produced by Harry M. Miller and directed by Jim Sharman, who also designed the production.  The tribe included Keith Glass and then Reg Livermore as Berger, John Waters as Claude and Sharon Redd as The Magician. Redd was one of six African-Americans brought to Australia to provide a racially integrated tribe. The production broke local box-office records and ran for two years, but because of some of the language in the show, the cast album was banned in Queensland and New Zealand.  The production transferred to Melbourne in 1971 and then had a national tour.  It marked the stage debut of Boston-born Australian vocalist Marcia Hines.  In Mexico the production was banned by the government after one night in Acapulco. An 18-year-old Sônia Braga appeared in the 1969 Brazilian production.

Another notable production was in Belgrade, in the former Yugoslavia, in 1969. It was the first Hair to be produced in a communist country. The show, translated into Serbian, was directed by female producer-director Mira Trailović at the Atelje 212 theatre. It featured Dragan Nikolić, Branko Milićević, Seka Sablić and Dušan Prelević. Over four years, the production received 250 performances and was attended by president Tito. Local references in the script included barbs aimed at Mao Zedong as well as Albania, Yugoslavia's traditional rival.

By 1970, Hair was a huge financial success, and nineteen productions had been staged outside of North America.  In addition to those named above, these included productions in Scandinavia, South America, Italy, Israel, Japan, Canada, the Netherlands, Switzerland and Austria.  According to Billboard, the various productions of the show were raking in almost $1 million every ten days, and royalties were being collected for 300 different recordings of the show's songs, making it "the most successful score in history as well as the most performed score ever written for the Broadway stage."

Themes 
Hair explores many of the themes of the hippie movement of the 1960s.  Theatre writer Scott Miller described these as follows:

[T]he youth of America, especially those on college campuses, started protesting all the things that they saw wrong with America: racism, environmental destruction, poverty, sexism and sexual repression, violence at home and the war in Vietnam, depersonalization from new technologies, and corruption in politics. ... Contrary to popular opinion, the hippies had great respect for America and believed that they were the true patriots, the only ones who genuinely wanted to save our country and make it the best it could be once again. ... [Long] hair was the hippies' flag – their ... symbol not only of rebellion but also of new possibilities, a symbol of the rejection of discrimination and restrictive gender roles (a philosophy celebrated in the song "My Conviction").  It symbolized equality between men and women. ... [T]he hippies' chosen clothing also made statements. Drab work clothes (jeans, work shirts, pea coats) were a rejection of materialism.  Clothing from other cultures, particularly the Third World and native Americans, represented their awareness of the global community and their rejection of U.S. imperialism and selfishness.  Simple cotton dresses and other natural fabrics were a rejection of synthetics, a return to natural things and simpler times.  Some hippies wore old World War II or Civil War jackets as way of co-opting the symbols of war into their newfound philosophy of nonviolence.

Race and the tribe 
Extending the precedents set by Show Boat (1927) and Porgy and Bess (1935), Hair opened the Broadway musical to racial integration; fully one-third of the cast was African American.  Except for satirically in skits, the roles for the black members of the tribe portrayed them as equals, breaking away from the traditional roles for black people in entertainment as slaves or servants. An Ebony magazine article declared that the show was the biggest outlet for black actors in the history of the U.S. stage.

Several songs and scenes from the show address racial issues. "Colored Spade", which introduces the character Hud, a militant black male, is a long list of racial slurs ("jungle bunny ... little black sambo") topped off with the declaration that Hud is the "president of the United States of love". At the end of his song, he tells the tribe that the "boogie man" will get them, as the tribe pretends to be frightened. "Dead End", sung by black tribe members, is a list of street signs that symbolize black frustration and alienation. One of the tribe's protest chants is "What do we think is really great? To bomb, lynch and segregate!"  "Black Boys/White Boys" is an exuberant acknowledgement of interracial sexual attraction; the U.S. Supreme Court had struck down laws banning interracial marriage in 1967.  Another of the tribe's protest chants is "Black, white, yellow, red. Copulate in a king-sized bed."

"Abie Baby" is part of the Act 2 "trip" sequence: four African witch doctors, who have just killed various American historical, cultural and fictional characters, sing the praises of Abraham Lincoln, portrayed by a black female tribe member, whom they decide not to kill. The first part of the song contains stereotypical language that black characters used in old movies, like "I's finished ... pluckin' y'all's chickens" and "I's free now thanks to y'all, Master Lincoln".  The Lincoln character then recites a modernized version of the Gettysburg Address, while a white female tribe member polishes Lincoln's shoes with her blond hair.

The many references to Native Americans throughout the script are part of the anti-consumerism, naturalism focus of the hippie movement and of Hair.  The characters in the show are referred to as the "tribe", borrowing the term for Native American communities.  The cast of each production chooses a tribal name: "The practice is not just cosmetic ... the entire cast must work together, must like each other, and often within the show, must work as a single organism.  All the sense of family, of belonging, of responsibility and loyalty inherent in the word 'tribe' has to be felt by the cast." To enhance this feeling, O'Horgan put the cast through sensitivity exercises based on trust, touching, listening and intensive examination that broke down barriers between the cast and crew and encouraged bonding.  These exercises were based on techniques developed at the Esalen Institute and Polish Lab Theater.  The idea of Claude, Berger and Sheila living together is another facet of the 1960s concept of tribe.

Nudity, sexual freedom and drug use 
The brief nude scene at the end of Act I was a subject of controversy and notoriety.  Miller writes that "nudity was a big part of the hippie culture, both as a rejection of the sexual repression of their parents and also as a statement about naturalism, spirituality, honesty, openness, and freedom.  The naked body was beautiful, something to be celebrated and appreciated, not scorned and hidden. They saw their bodies and their sexuality as gifts, not as 'dirty' things."

Hair glorifies sexual freedom in a variety of ways. In addition to acceptance of interracial attraction, the characters' lifestyle acts as a sexually and politically charged updating of La bohème; as Rado explained, "The love element of the peace movement was palpable."  In the song "Sodomy", Woof exhorts everyone to "join the holy orgy Kama Sutra".  Toward the end of Act 2, the tribe members reveal their free love tendencies when they banter back and forth about who will sleep with whom that night. Woof has a crush on Mick Jagger, and a three-way embrace between Claude, Berger and Sheila turns into a Claude–Berger kiss.

Various illegal drugs are taken by the characters during the course of the show, most notably a hallucinogen during the trip sequence.  The song "Walking in Space" begins the sequence, and the lyrics celebrate the experience declaring "how dare they try to end this beauty ... in this dive we rediscover sensation ... our eyes are open, wide, wide, wide".  Similarly, in the song "Donna", Berger sings that "I'm evolving through the drugs that you put down."  At another point, Jeanie smokes marijuana and dismisses the critics of "pot".  Generally, the tribe favors hallucinogenic or "mind expanding" drugs, such as LSD and marijuana, while disapproving of other drugs such as speed and depressants.  For example, Jeanie, after revealing that she is pregnant by a "speed freak", says that "methedrine is a bad scene".  The song "Hashish" provides a list of pharmaceuticals, both illegal and legal, including cocaine, alcohol, LSD, opium and Thorazine, which is used as an antipsychotic.

Pacifism and environmentalism 
The theme of opposition to the war that pervades the show is unified by the plot thread that progresses through the book – Claude's moral dilemma over whether to burn his draft card. Pacifism is explored throughout the extended trip sequence in Act 2.  The lyrics to "Three-Five-Zero-Zero", which is sung during that sequence, evoke the horrors of war ("ripped open by metal explosion").  The song is based on Allen Ginsberg's 1966 poem, "Wichita Vortex Sutra".  In the poem, General Maxwell Taylor proudly reports to the press the number of enemy soldiers killed in one month, repeating it digit by digit, for effect: "Three-Five-Zero-Zero."  The song begins with images of death and dying and turns into a manic dance number, echoing Maxwell's glee at reporting the enemy casualties, as the tribe chants "Take weapons up and begin to kill".  The song also includes the repeated phrase "Prisoners in niggertown/ It's a dirty little war".

"Don't Put It Down" satirizes the unexamined patriotism of people who are "crazy for the American flag".  "Be In (Hare Krishna)" praises the peace movement and events like the San Francisco and Central Park Be-Ins.  Throughout the show, the tribe chants popular protest slogans like "What do we want? Peace!  – When do we want it? Now!" and "Do not enter the induction center".  The upbeat song, "Let the Sun Shine In", is a call to action, to reject the darkness of war and change the world for the better.

Hair also aims its satire at the pollution caused by civilization. Jeanie appears from a trap door in the stage wearing a gas mask and then sings the song "Air": "Welcome, sulfur dioxide. Hello carbon monoxide. The air ... is everywhere".  She suggests that pollution will eventually kill her, "vapor and fume at the stone of my tomb, breathing like a sullen perfume".  In a comic, pro-green vein, when Woof introduces himself, he explains that he "grows things" like "beets, and corn ... and sweet peas" and that he "loves the flowers and the fuzz and the trees".

Religion and astrology 
Religion, particularly Catholicism, appears both overtly and symbolically throughout the piece, and it is often made the brunt of a joke. Berger sings of looking for "my Donna", giving it the double meaning of the woman he's searching for and the Madonna. During "Sodomy", a hymn-like paean to all that is "dirty" about sex, the cast strikes evocative religious positions: the Pietà and Christ on the cross. Before the song, Woof recites a modified rosary.  In Act II, when Berger gives imaginary pills to various famous figures, he offers "a pill for the Pope". In "Going Down", after being kicked out of school, Berger compares himself to Lucifer: "Just like the angel that fell / Banished forever to hell / Today have I been expelled / From high school heaven."  Claude becomes a classic Christ figure at various points in the script.  In Act I, Claude enters, saying, "I am the Son of God.  I shall vanish and be forgotten," then gives benediction to the tribe and the audience.  Claude suffers from indecision, and, in his Gethsemane at the end of Act I, he asks "Where Do I Go?".  There are textual allusions to Claude being on a cross, and, in the end, he is chosen to give his life for the others.  Berger has been seen as a John the Baptist figure, preparing the way for Claude.

Songs like "Good Morning, Starshine" and "Aquarius" reflect the 1960s cultural interest in astrological and cosmic concepts.  "Aquarius" was the result of Rado's research into his own astrological sign.  The company's astrologer, Maria Crummere, was consulted about casting: Sheila was usually played by a Libra or Capricorn and Berger by a Leo, although Ragni, the original Berger, was a Virgo.  Crummere was also consulted when deciding when the show would open on Broadway and in other cities.  The 1971 Broadway Playbill reported that she chose April 29, 1968 for the Broadway premiere.  "The 29th was auspicious ... because the moon was high, indicating that people would attend in masses.  The position of the 'history makers' (Pluto, Uranus, Jupiter) in the 10th house made the show unique, powerful and a money-maker.  And the fact that Neptune was on the ascendancy foretold that Hair would develop a reputation involving sex."

In Mexico, where Crummere did not pick the opening date, the show was closed down by the government after one night.  She was not pleased with the date of the Boston opening (where the producers were sued over the show's content) saying, "Jupiter will be in opposition to naughty Saturn, and the show opens the very day of the sun's eclipse. Terrible."  But there was no astrologically safe time in the near future.

Literary themes and symbolism 
Hair makes many references to Shakespeare's plays, especially Romeo and Juliet and Hamlet, and, at times, takes lyrical material directly from Shakespeare.  For example, the lyrics to the song "What a Piece of Work Is Man" are from Hamlet (II: scene 2) and portions of "Flesh Failures" ("the rest is silence") are from Hamlet's final lines.  In "Flesh Failures/Let The Sun Shine In", the lyrics "Eyes, look your last!/ Arms, take your last embrace! And lips, O you/ The doors of breath, seal with a righteous kiss" are from Romeo and Juliet (V: iii, 111–14).  According to Miller, the Romeo suicide imagery makes the point that, with our complicity in war, we are killing ourselves.

Symbolically, the running plot of Claude's indecision, especially his resistance to burning his draft card, which ultimately causes his demise, has been seen as a parallel to Hamlet: "the melancholy hippie".  The symbolism is carried into the last scene, where Claude appears as a ghostly spirit among his friends wearing an army uniform in an ironic echo of an earlier scene, where he says, "I know what I want to be ... invisible".  According to Public Theater Artistic Director Oskar Eustis, "Both [Hair and Hamlet] center on idealistic brilliant men as they struggle to find their place in a world marred by war, violence, and venal politics.  They see both the luminous possibilities and the harshest realities of being human.  In the end, unable to effectively combat the evil around them, they tragically succumb."

Other literary references include the song "Three-Five-Zero-Zero", based on Ginsberg's poem "Wichita Vortex Sutra", and, in the psychedelic drug trip sequence, the portrayal of Scarlett O'Hara, from Gone with the Wind, and activist African-American poet LeRoi Jones.

Dramatics 
In his introduction to the published script of Viet Rock, Richard Schechner says, "performance, action, and event are the key terms of our theatre – and these terms are not literary."  In the 1950s, Off-off Broadway theaters began experimenting with non-traditional theater roles, blurring the lines between playwright, director, and actor.  The playwright's job was not just to put words on a page, but to create a theatrical experience based on a central idea.  By 1967, theaters such as The Living Theatre, La MaMa E.T.C. and The Open Theatre were actively devising plays from improvisational scenes crafted in the rehearsal space, rather than following a traditional script.

Viet Rock and Hair 
Megan Terry's Viet Rock was created using this improvisational process.  Scenes in Viet Rock were connected in "prelogical ways": a scene could be built from a tangent from the scene before, it could be connected psychologically, or it could be in counterpoint to the previous scene.  Actors were asked to switch roles in the middle of a show, and frequently in mid-scene.  In her stage directions for a Senate hearing scene in Viet Rock, Terry wrote, "The actors should take turns being senators and witnesses; the transformations should be abrupt and total.  When the actor is finished with one character he becomes another, or just an actor."

Hair was designed in much the same way.  Tom O'Horgan, the show's Broadway director, was intimately involved in the experimental theatre movement.  In the transition to Broadway, O'Horgan and the writers rearranged scenes to increase the experimental aspects of the show.  Hair asks its actors to assume several different characters throughout the course of the piece, and, as in Claude's psychedelic trip in Act 2, sometimes during the same scene.  Both Hair and Viet Rock include rock music, borrowed heavily from mass media, and frequently break down the invisible "fourth wall" to interact with the audience.  For example, in the opening number, the tribe mingles with audience members, and at the end of the show, the audience is invited on stage.

Production design 
In the original Broadway production, the stage was completely open, with no curtain and the fly area and grid exposed to the audience.  The proscenium arch was outlined with climb-ready scaffolding.  Wagner's spare set was painted in shades of grey with street graffiti stenciled on the stage.  The stage was raked, and a tower of abstract scaffolding upstage at the rear merged a Native American totem pole and a modern sculpture of a crucifix-shaped tree.  This scaffolding was decorated with found objects that the cast had gathered from the streets of New York.  These included a life-size papier-mâché bus driver, the head of Jesus, and a neon marquee of the Waverly movie theater in Greenwich Village.  Potts' costumes were based on hippie street clothes, made more theatrical with enhanced color and texture.  Some of these included mixed parts of military uniforms, bell bottom jeans with Ukrainian embroidery, tie dyed T-shirts and a red white and blue fringed coat.  Early productions were primarily reproductions of this basic design.

Nude scene 
"Much has been written about that scene ... most of it silly," wrote Gene Lees in High Fidelity. The scene was inspired by two men who took off their clothes to antagonize the police during an informal anti-war gathering.  During "Where Do I Go?", the stage was covered in a giant scrim, beneath which those choosing to participate in the scene removed their clothes.  At the musical cue, "they [stood] naked and motionless, their bodies bathed in Fisher's light projection of floral patterns.  They chant[ed] of 'beads, flowers, freedom, and happiness.  It lasted only twenty seconds. Indeed, the scene happened so quickly and was so dimly lit that it prompted Jack Benny, during the interval at a London preview, to quip, "Did you happen to notice if any of them were Jewish?" Nevertheless, the scene prompted threats of censorship and even violent reactions in some places. It also became fodder for pop-cultural jokes. Groucho Marx quipped, "I was gonna go see it, and then I called up the theater. ... They said the tickets were $11 apiece. I told them I'd call back, went into my bathroom, took off all my clothes, and looked at myself in the full-length mirror. Then I called the theater and said, 'Forget it.

The nudity was optional for the performers. The French cast was "the nudest" of the foreign groups, while the London cast "found nudity the hardest to achieve". The Swedish cast was reluctant to disrobe, but in Copenhagen, the tribe thought the nudity too tame and decided to walk naked up and down the aisle during the show's prelude. In some early performances, the Germans played their scene behind a big sheet labeled "CENSORED". Original Broadway cast member Natalie Mosco said, "I was dead set against the nude scene at first, but I remembered my acting teacher having said that part of acting is being private in public. So I did it."  According to Melba Moore, "It doesn't mean anything except what you want it to mean. We put so much value on clothing. . ...  It's like so much else people get uptight about." Donna Summer, who was in the German production, said that "it was not meant to be sexual. ... We stood naked to comment on the fact that society makes more of nudity than killing." Rado said that "being naked in front of an audience, you're baring your soul.  Not only the soul but the whole body was being exposed. It was very apt, very honest and almost necessary."

Music 

After studying the music of the Bantu at Cape Town University, MacDermot incorporated African rhythms into the score of Hair.  He listened to "what [the Bantu] called quaylas ... [which have a] very characteristic beat, very similar to rock.  Much deeper though. ... Hair is very African – a lot of [the] rhythms, not the tunes so much." Quaylas stress beats on unexpected syllables, and this influence can be heard in songs like "What a Piece of Work Is Man" and "Ain't Got No Grass".  MacDermot said, "My idea was to make a total funk show. They said they wanted rock & roll – but to me that translated to 'funk.'" That funk is evident throughout the score, notably in songs like "Colored Spade" and "Walking in Space".

MacDermot has claimed that the songs "can't all be the same.  You've got to get different styles. ... I like to think they're all a little different."  As such, the music in Hair runs the gamut of rock: from the rockabilly sensibilities of "Don't Put it Down" to the folk rock rhythms of "Frank Mills" and "What a Piece of Work is Man".  "Easy to Be Hard" is pure rhythm and blues, and protest rock anthems abound: "Ain't Got No" and "The Flesh Failures".  The acid rock of "Walking in Space" and "Aquarius" are balanced by the mainstream pop of "Good Morning Starshine".  Scott Miller ties the music of Hair to the hippies' political themes: "The hippies ... were determined to create art of the people and their chosen art form, rock/folk music was by its definition, populist. ... [T]he hippies' music was often very angry, its anger directed at those who would prostitute the Constitution, who would sell America out, who would betray what America stood for; in other words, directed at their parents and the government."  Theatre historian John Kenrick explains the application of rock music to the medium of the stage:

The music did not resonate with everyone. Leonard Bernstein remarked "the songs are just laundry lists" and walked out of the production. Richard Rodgers could only hear the beat and called it "one-third music".
John Fogerty said, "Hair is such a watered down version of what is really going on that I can't get behind it at all." Gene Lees, writing for High Fidelity, stated that John Lennon found it "dull", and he wrote, "I do not know any musician who thinks it's good."

Songs 
The score had many more songs than were typical of Broadway shows of the day. This list reflects the most common Broadway lineup.Act I "Aquarius"  – Tribe and soloist (often Dionne)
 "Donna" – Berger and Tribe
 "Hashish" – Tribe
 "Sodomy" – Woof and Tribe
 "Colored Spade" – Hud, Woof, Berger, Claude and Tribe
 "Manchester England" – Claude and Tribe
 "I'm Black/Ain't Got No" – Woof, Hud, Dionne and Tribe
 "I Believe in Love" – Sheila and Tribe trio
 "Air" – Jeanie with Crissy and Dionne
 "Initials (L.B.J.)" – Tribe
 "I Got Life" – Claude and Tribe
 "Going Down" – Berger and Tribe
 "Hair" – Claude, Berger, and Tribe
 "My Conviction" – Margaret Mead (tourist lady)
 "Easy to Be Hard" – Sheila
 "Don't Put It Down" – Berger, Woof and male Tribe member
 "Frank Mills" – Crissy
 "Be-In (Hare Krishna)" – Tribe
 "Where Do I Go?" – Claude and TribeAct II "Electric Blues" – Tribe quartet
 "Black Boys" – Tribe sextet (three male, three female)
 "White Boys" – Tribe Supremes trio
 "Walking in Space" – Tribe
 "Yes, I's Finished/Abie Baby" – Abraham Lincoln and Tribe trio (Hud and two men)
 "Three-Five-Zero-Zero" – Tribe
 "What a Piece of Work Is Man" – Tribe duo
 "Good Morning Starshine" – Sheila and Tribe
 "The Bed" – Tribe
 "Aquarius" (reprise) – Tribe
 "Manchester England" (reprise) – Claude and Tribe
 "Eyes Look Your Last" – Claude and Tribe
 "The Flesh Failures (Let the Sunshine In)" – Claude, Sheila, Dionne and Tribe

The show was under almost perpetual re-write.  Thirteen songs were added between the production at the Public Theater and Broadway, including "I Believe in Love".  "The Climax" and "Dead End" were cut between the productions, and "Exanaplanetooch" and "You Are Standing on My Bed" were present in previews but cut before Broadway.  The Shakespearean speech "What a piece of work is a man" was originally spoken by Claude and musicalized by MacDermot for Broadway, and "Hashish" was formed from an early speech of Berger's. Subsequent productions have included "Hello There", "Dead End", and "Hippie Life" – a song originally written for the film that Rado included in several productions in Europe in the 1990s. The 2009 Broadway revival included the ten-second "Sheila Franklin" and "O Great God of Power", two songs that were cut from the original production.

 Recordings 
The first recording of Hair was made in 1967 featuring the off-Broadway cast. The original Broadway cast recording received a Grammy Award in 1969 for Best Score from an Original Cast Show Album and sold nearly 3 million copies in the U.S. by December 1969. It charted at No. 1 on the Billboard 200, the last Broadway cast album to do so (as of 2016). It stayed at No. 1 for 13 weeks in 1969. The album also peaked at number 2 in Australia in 1970. The New York Times noted in 2007 that "The cast album of Hair was ... a must-have for the middle classes.  Its exotic orange-and-green cover art imprinted itself instantly and indelibly on the psyche. ... [It] became a pop-rock classic that, like all good pop, has an appeal that transcends particular tastes for genre or period." In 2019, the Library of Congress added the original Broadway cast album to the National Recording Registry. 

The 1993 London revival cast album contains new music that has been incorporated into the standard rental version. A 1969 studio album, DisinHAIRited (RCA Victor LSO-1163), contains the following songs that had been written for the show but saw varying amounts of stage time. Some of the songs were cut between the Public and Broadway productions, some had been left off the original cast album due to space, and a few were never performed onstage.

 "One Thousand-Year-Old Man"
 "So Sing the Children of the Avenue"
 "Manhattan Beggar"
 "Sheila Franklin/Reading the Writing"
 "Washing the World"
 "Exanaplanetooch"
 "Hello There"
 "Mr. Berger"
 "I'm Hung"
 "The Climax"
 "Electric Blues"
 "I Dig"
 "Going Down"
 "You Are Standing on My Bed"
 "The Bed"
 "Mess O' Dirt"
 "Dead End"
 "Oh Great God of Power"
 "Eyes Look Your Last/Sentimental Ending"

Songs from Hair have been recorded by numerous artists, including Shirley Bassey, Barbra Streisand and Diana Ross.  "Good Morning Starshine" was sung on a 1969 episode of Sesame Street by cast member Bob McGrath, and versions by artists such as Sarah Brightman, Petula Clark, and Strawberry Alarm Clock have been recorded. Artists as varied as Liza Minnelli and The Lemonheads have recorded "Frank Mills", and Andrea McArdle, Jennifer Warnes, and Sérgio Mendes have each contributed versions of "Easy to Be Hard". Hair also helped launch recording careers for performers Meat Loaf, Dobie Gray, Jennifer Warnes, Jobriath, Bert Sommer, Ronnie Dyson, Donna Summer and Melba Moore, among others.

The score of Hair saw chart successes, as well. The 5th Dimension released "Aquarius/Let the Sunshine In" in 1969, which won Record of the Year in 1970 and topped the charts for six weeks. Nina Simone's 1968 medley of "Ain't Got No, I Got Life" reached the top 5 on the British charts. In 1970, ASCAP announced that "Aquarius" was played more frequently on U.S. radio and television than any other song that year.

Productions in England, Germany, France, Sweden, Japan, Israel, the Netherlands, Australia and elsewhere released cast albums, and over 1,000 vocal and/or instrumental performances of individual songs from Hair have been recorded. Such broad attention was paid to the recordings of Hair that, after an unprecedented bidding war, ABC Records was willing to pay a record amount for MacDermot's next Broadway adaptation Two Gentlemen of Verona.

 Critical reception 
Reception to Hair upon its Broadway premiere was, with exceptions, overwhelmingly positive.  Clive Barnes wrote in the New York Times: "What is so likable about Hair ... ?  I think it is simply that it is so likable.  So new, so fresh, and so unassuming, even in its pretensions."  John J. O'Connor of The Wall Street Journal said the show was "exuberantly defiant and the production explodes into every nook and cranny of the Biltmore Theater". Richard Watts Jr. of the New York Post wrote that "it has a surprising if perhaps unintentional charm, its high spirits are contagious, and its young zestfulness makes it difficult to resist."

Television reviews were even more enthusiastic.  Allan Jeffreys of ABC said the actors were "the most talented hippies you'll ever see ... directed in a wonderfully wild fashion by Tom O'Horgan."  Leonard Probst of NBC said "Hair is the only new concept in musicals on Broadway in years and it's more fun than any other this season".  John Wingate of WOR TV praised MacDermot's "dynamic score" that "blasts and soars", and Len Harris of CBS said "I've finally found the best musical of the Broadway season ... it's that sloppy, vulgar, terrific tribal love rock musical Hair."

A reviewer from Variety, on the other hand, called the show "loony" and "without a story, form, music, dancing, beauty or artistry. ... It's impossible to tell whether [the cast has] talent.  Maybe talent is irrelevant in this new kind of show business."  Reviews in the news weeklies were mixed; Jack Kroll in Newsweek wrote, "There is no denying the sheer kinetic drive of this new Hair ... there is something hard, grabby, slightly corrupt about O'Horgan's virtuosity, like Busby Berkeley gone bitchy."  But a reviewer from Time wrote that although the show "thrums with vitality [it is] crippled by being a bookless musical and, like a boneless fish, it drifts when it should swim."

Reviews were mixed when Hair opened in London.  Irving Wardle in The Times wrote, "Its honesty and passion give it the quality of a true theatrical celebration – the joyous sound of a group of people telling the world exactly what they feel." In the Financial Times, B. A. Young agreed that Hair was "not only a wildly enjoyable evening, but a thoroughly moral one."  However, in his final review before retiring after 48 years, 78-year-old W. A. Darlington of The Daily Telegraph wrote that he had "tried hard", but found the evening "a complete bore – noisy, ugly and quite desperately funny".

Acknowledging the show's critics, Scott Miller wrote in 2001 that "some people can't see past the appearance of chaos and randomness to the brilliant construction and sophisticated imagery underneath."  Miller notes, "Not only did many of the lyrics not rhyme, but many of the songs didn't really have endings, just a slowing down and stopping, so the audience didn't know when to applaud. ... The show rejected every convention of Broadway, of traditional theatre in general, and of the American musical in specific.  And it was brilliant."

Awards and nominations
Original Broadway production

2009 Broadway revival

 Social change Hair challenged many of the norms held by Western society in 1968.  The name itself, inspired by the name of a Jim Dine painting depicting a comb and a few strands of hair,Rizzo, Frank (August 31, 2008).  "Hair: Reviving the Revolution" .  Hartford Courant, courant.com.  Retrieved on November 9, 2013 (subscription required) was a reaction to the restrictions of civilization and consumerism and a preference for naturalism.  Rado remembers that long hair "was a visible form of awareness in the consciousness expansion. The longer the hair got, the more expansive the mind was. Long hair was shocking, and it was a revolutionary act to grow long hair. It was kind of a flag, really."

The musical caused controversy when it was first staged.  The Act I finale was the first time a Broadway show had seen totally naked actors and actresses, and the show was charged with the desecration of the American flag and the use of obscene language."Desecration of Flag Ires Hub More Than The Nudity In Hair ". Variety (michaelbutler.com). February 25, 1970. Retrieved on April 16, 2008.  These controversies, in addition to the anti-Vietnam War theme, attracted occasional threats and acts of violence during the show's early years and became the basis for legal actions both when the show opened in other cities and on tour.  Two cases eventually reached the U.S. Supreme Court.

 Legal challenges and violent reactions 
The touring company of Hair met with resistance throughout the United States.  In South Bend, Indiana, the Morris Civic Auditorium refused booking, and in Evansville, Indiana, the production was picketed by several church groups.  In Indianapolis, Indiana, the producers had difficulty securing a theater, and city authorities suggested that the cast wear body stockings as a compromise to the city's ordinance prohibiting publicly displayed nudity. Productions were frequently confronted with the closure of theaters by the fire marshal, as in Gladewater, Texas. Chattanooga's 1972 refusal to allow the play to be shown at the city-owned Memorial Auditorium"Supreme Court: Letting The Sun Shine In ". Newsweek (michaelbutler.com). March 31, 1975. Retrieved on April 11, 2008. was later found by the U.S. Supreme Court to be an unlawful prior restraint.

The legal challenges against the Boston production were appealed to the U.S. Supreme Court.  The Chief of the Licensing Bureau took exception to the portrayal of the American flag in the piece, saying, "anyone who desecrates the flag should be whipped on Boston Common."  Although the scene was removed before opening, the District Attorney's office began plans to stop the show, claiming that "lewd and lascivious" actions were taking place onstage.  The Hair legal team obtained an injunction against criminal prosecution from the Superior Court, and the D.A. appealed to the Massachusetts Supreme Judicial Court.  At the request of both parties, several of the justices viewed the production and handed down a ruling that "each member of the cast [must] be clothed to a reasonable extent." The cast defiantly played the scene nude later that night, stating that the ruling was vague as to when it would take effect.  The next day, April 10, 1970, the production closed, and movie houses, fearing the ruling on nudity, began excising scenes from films in their exhibition.  After the Federal appellate bench reversed the Massachusetts court's ruling, the D.A. appealed the case to the U.S. Supreme Court.  In a 4–4 decision, the Court upheld the lower court's decision, allowing Hair to re-open on May 22.

In April 1971, a bomb was thrown at the exterior of a theater in Cleveland, Ohio that had been housing a production, bouncing off the marquee and shattering windows in the building and in nearby storefronts.  That same month, the families of cast member Jonathon Johnson and stage manager Rusty Carlson died in a fire in the Cleveland hotel where 33 members of the show's troupe had been staying."Cleveland Fire Kills 4 in Hair Family ". Variety (michaelbutler.com). April 20, 1971. Retrieved on April 11, 2008.  The Sydney, Australia production's opening night was interrupted by a bomb scare in June 1969.

 Worldwide reactions 
Local reactions to the controversial material varied greatly.  San Francisco's large hippie population considered the show an extension of the street activities there, often blurring the barrier between art and life by meditating with the cast and frequently finding themselves onstage during the show.  An 18-year-old Princess Anne was seen dancing onstage in London, and in Washington DC, Henry Kissinger attended.  In St. Paul, Minnesota, a protesting clergyman released 18 white mice into the lobby hoping to frighten the audience. Capt. Jim Lovell and Jack Swigert, after dubbing Apollo 13's lunar module "Aquarius" after the song, walked out of the production at the Biltmore in protest of perceived anti-Americanism and disrespect of the flag.

An Acapulco, Mexico production of Hair, directed by Castelli, played in 1969 for one night.  After the performance, the theater, located across the street from a popular local bordello, was padlocked by the government, which said the production was "detrimental to the morals of youth."  The cast was arrested soon after the performance and taken to Immigration, where they agreed to leave the country, but because of legal complications they were forced to go into hiding. They were expelled from Mexico days later.Monsiváis, Carlos. "Con címbalos de Júbilo", Dias de Guardar, pp. 20–27 (1970), Ediciones Era: Mexico, accessed October 14, 2014  (Spanish language)Hair effectively marked the end of stage censorship in the United Kingdom.<ref name=london>Lewis, Anthony (September 29, 1968). "[https://www.nytimes.com/1968/09/29/archives/londoners-cool-to-hairs-nudity-fourletter-words-shock-few-at.html?sq=hair&scp=1&st=p Londoners Cool to Hairs Nudity; Four-Letter Words Shock Few at Musical's Debut] ". The New York Times: p. 76.  Retrieved on April 11, 2008.</ref>  London's stage censor, the Lord Chamberlain, originally refused to license the musical, and the opening was delayed until Parliament passed a bill stripping him of his licensing power.  In Munich, authorities threatened to close the production if the nude scene remained; however, after a local Hair spokesman declared that his relatives had been marched nude into Auschwitz, the authorities relented.  In Bergen, Norway, local citizens formed a human barricade to try to prevent the performance.

The Parisian production encountered little controversy, and the cast disrobed for the nude scene "almost religiously" according to Castelli, nudity being common on stage in Paris.  Even in Paris there was nevertheless occasional opposition, however, such as when a member of the local Salvation Army used a portable loud speaker to exhort the audience to halt the presentation.Hess, John L. (February 2, 1970). "Salvation Army Jousts With Hair in Paris; A Counterattack by Religious Troops Draws Crowds ". The New York Times: pp. 14.  Retrieved on June 5, 2008.

 Subsequent productions 

 1970s 
A Broadway revival of Hair opened in 1977 for a run of 43 performances.  It was produced by Butler, directed by O'Horgan and performed in the Biltmore Theater, where the original Broadway production had played. The cast included Ellen Foley, Annie Golden, Loretta Devine, Cleavant Derricks and Kristen Vigard.  Newcomer Peter Gallagher left the ensemble during previews to take the role of Danny Zuko in a tour of Grease.  Reviews were generally negative, and critics accused the production of "showing its gray". Few major revivals of Hair followed until the early 1990s.

 1980s and 1990s 
A 20th anniversary concert event was held in May 1988 at the United Nations General Assembly to benefit children with AIDS. The event was sponsored by First Lady Nancy Reagan with Barbara Walters giving the night's opening introduction. Rado, Ragni and MacDermot reunited to write nine new songs for the concert. The cast of 163 actors included former stars from various productions around the globe: Moore, Vereen, Williams and Summer, as well as guest performers Bea Arthur, Frank Stallone and Dr. Ruth Westheimer. Ticket prices ranged from $250 to $5,000 and the proceeds went to the United States Committee for UNICEF and the Creo Society's Fund for Children with AIDS.

A 1985 production of Hair mounted in Montreal was reportedly the 70th professional production of the musical.  In November 1988, Michael Butler produced Hair at Chicago's Vic Theater to celebrate the shows' 20th anniversary.  The production was well received and ran until February 1989.  From 1990 to 1991, Pink Lace Productions ran a U.S. national tour of Hair that included stops in South Carolina, Georgia, Tennessee and Kentucky. After Ragni died in 1991, MacDermot and Rado continued to write new songs for revivals through the 1990s.  Hair Sarajevo, AD 1992 was staged during the siege of Sarajevo as an appeal for peace.  Rado directed a $1 million, 11 city national tour in 1994 that featured actor Luther Creek.  With MacDermot returning to oversee the music, Rado's tour celebrated the show's 25th anniversary.  A small 1990 "bus and truck" production of Hair toured Europe for over 3 years, and Rado directed various European productions from 1995 to 1999.

A production opened in Australia in 1992 and a short-lived London revival starring John Barrowman and Paul Hipp opened at the Old Vic in London in 1993, directed by Michael Bogdanov.Shenton, Mark. "Broadway's Hair to Let It All Hang Out at West End's Gielgud Theatre" , Playbill, November 12, 2009 While the London production was faithful to the original, a member of the production staff said the reason it "flopped" was because the tribe consisted of "Thatcher's children who didn't really get it".  Other productions were mounted around the world, including South Africa, where the show had been banned until the eradication of Apartheid.  In 1996, Butler brought a month-long production to Chicago, employing the Pacific Musical Theater, a professional troupe in residence at California State University, Fullerton. Butler ran the show concurrently with the 1996 Democratic National Convention, echoing the last time the DNC was in Chicago: 1968.  A 30th Anniversary Off-Off Broadway production was staged at Third Eye Repertory. It was directed by Shawn Rozsa.

 2000s and 2010s 
In 2001, the Reprise! theatre company in Los Angeles performed Hair at the Wadsworth Theatre, starring Steven Weber as Berger, Sam Harris as Claude and Jennifer Leigh Warren as Sheila. That same year, Encores! Great American Musicals in Concert ended its 2001 City Center season with a production of Hair starring Luther Creek, Idina Menzel and Tom Plotkin, and featuring Hair composer Galt MacDermot on stage playing the keyboards. An Actors' Fund benefit of the show was performed for one night at the New Amsterdam Theater in New York City in 2004. The Tribe included Shoshana Bean, Raúl Esparza, Jim J. Bullock, Liz Callaway, Gavin Creel, Eden Espinosa, Harvey Fierstein, Ana Gasteyer, Annie Golden, Jennifer Hudson, Julia Murney, Jai Rodriguez, RuPaul, Michael McKean, Laura Benanti and Adam Pascal.

In 2005, a London production opened at the Gate Theatre, directed by Daniel Kramer. James Rado approved an updating of the musical's script to place it in the context of the Iraq War instead of the Vietnam War. Kramer's modernized interpretation included "Aquarius" sung over a megaphone in Times Square, and nudity that called to mind images from Abu Ghraib. In March 2006, Rado collaborated with director Robert Prior for a CanStage production of Hair in Toronto, and a revival produced by Pieter Toerien toured South Africa in 2007. Directed by Paul Warwick Griffin, with choreography by Timothy Le Roux, the show ran at the Montecasino Theatre in Johannesburg and at Theatre on the Bay in Cape Town. A two-week run played at the Teatro Tapia in Old San Juan, Puerto Rico, in March 2010, directed by Yinoelle Colón.

Michael Butler produced Hair at the MET Theatre in Los Angeles from September 14 through December 30, 2007.  The show was directed and choreographed by Bo Crowell, with musical direction from Christian Nesmith (son of Michael Nesmith). Butler's production of Hair won the LA Weekly Theater Award for Musical of the Year.

For three nights in September 2007, Joe's Pub and the Public Theater presented a 40th anniversary production of Hair at the Delacorte Theater in Central Park.  This concert version, directed by Diane Paulus, featured Jonathan Groff as Claude and Galt MacDermot on stage on the keyboards.  The cast also included Karen Olivo as Sheila and Will Swenson as Berger.  Actors from the original Broadway production joined the cast on stage during the encore of "Let the Sun Shine In."  Demand for the show was overwhelming, as long lines and overnight waits for tickets far exceeded that for other Delacorte productions such as Mother Courage and Her Children starring Meryl Streep and Kevin Kline.

Nine months later, The Public Theater presented a fully staged production of Hair at the Delacorte in a limited run from July 22, 2008, to September 14, 2008.  Paulus again directed, with choreography by Karole Armitage.  Groff and Swenson returned as Claude and Berger, together with others from the concert cast. Caren Lyn Manuel played Sheila, and Christopher J. Hanke replaced Groff as Claude on August 17. Reviews were generally positive, with Ben Brantley of The New York Times writing that "this production establishes the show as more than a vivacious period piece. Hair, it seems, has deeper roots than anyone remembered".  Time magazine wrote: "Hair ... has been reinvigorated and reclaimed as one of the great milestones in musical-theatre history. ...  Today Hair seems, if anything, more daring than ever."

 2009 Broadway revival and 2010 U.S. National Tour 
The Public Theater production transferred to Broadway at the Al Hirschfeld Theatre, beginning previews on March 6, 2009, with an official opening on March 31, 2009.  Paulus and Armitage again directed and choreographed, and most of the cast returned from the production in the park.  A pre-performance ticket lottery was held nightly for $25 box-seat tickets.  The opening cast included Gavin Creel as Claude, Will Swenson as Berger, Caissie Levy as Sheila, Megan Lawrence as Mother and Sasha Allen as Dionne.  Designers included Scott Pask (sets), Michael McDonald (costumes) and Kevin Adams (lighting).

Critical response was almost uniformly positive.  The New York Daily News headline proclaimed "Hair Revival's High Fun".  The review praised the daring direction, "colorfully kinetic" choreography and technical accomplishments of the show, especially the lighting, commenting that "as a smile-inducing celebration of life and freedom, [Hair is] highly communicable"; but warning: "If you're seated on the aisle, count on [the cast] to be in your face or your lap or ... braiding your tresses."  The New York Post wrote that the production "has emerged triumphant. ...  These days, the nation is fixated less on war and more on the economy.  As a result, the scenes that resonate most are the ones in which the kids exultantly reject the rat race."  Variety enthused, "Director Diane Paulus and her prodigiously talented cast connect with the material in ways that cut right to the 1967 rock musical's heart, generating tremendous energy that radiates to the rafters. ...  What could have been mere nostalgia instead becomes a full-immersion happening. ...  If this explosive production doesn't stir something in you, it may be time to check your pulse."  The Boston Globe dissented, saying that the production "felt canned" and "overblown" and that the revival "feels unbearably naive and unforgivably glib".  Ben Brantley, writing for The New York Times, reflected the majority, however, delivering a glowing review:

The Public Theater struggled to raise the $5.5 million budgeted for the Broadway transfer, because of the severity of the economic recession in late 2008, but it reached its goal by adding new producing partners. Director Diane Paulus helped keep costs low by using an inexpensive set. The show grossed a healthy $822,889 in its second week."Broadway grosses – Week Ending April 12, 2009",  Broadway World listing based on data from The Broadway League, April 14, 2009 On April 30, 2009, on the Late Show with David Letterman, the cast recreated a performance on the same stage at the Ed Sullivan Theater by the original tribe. The production won the Tony Award for Best Revival of a Musical, the Drama Desk Award for Outstanding Revival of a Musical and the Drama League Award for Distinguished Revival of a Musical. By August 2009, the revival had recouped its entire $5,760,000 investment, becoming one of the fastest-recouping musicals in Broadway history. Its cast album was nominated for the 2010 Grammy Award for Best Musical Show Album.

When the Broadway cast transferred to London for the 2010 West-End revival, a mostly new tribe took over on Broadway on March 9, 2010, including former American Idol finalists Ace Young as Berger and Diana DeGarmo as Sheila. Kyle Riabko assumed the role of Claude, Annaleigh Ashford played Jeanie, and Vanessa Ray was Chrissie. Rachel Bay Jones later played Mother and other roles. Sales decreased after the original cast transferred to London, and the revival closed on June 27, 2010, after 29 previews and 519 regular performances."Broadway Revival of Hair to Close on June 27" . Broadway.com, June 9, 2010

A U.S. National Tour of the production began on October 21, 2010.  Principals included Steel Burkhardt as Berger, Paris Remillard as Claude and Caren Lyn Tackett as Sheila.  The tour received mostly positive reviews.  The show returned to Broadway for an engagement at the St. James Theatre from July 5 through September 10, 2011.  After that stop, the tour resumed.  The tour ended on January 29, 2012.

 2010 West End revival 
The 2009 Broadway production was duplicated at the Gielgud Theatre in London's West End. Previews began on April 1, 2010, with an official opening on April 14. The producers were the Public Theater, together with Cameron Mackintosh and Broadway Across America. Nearly all of the New York cast relocated to London, but Luther Creek played Woof.Itzkoff, Dave. "Hair Extends From Broadway to London" . The New York Times, November 17, 2009  The London revival closed on September 4, 2010.

The production received mostly enthusiastic reviews. Michael Billington of The Guardian described it as "a vibrant, joyous piece of living theatre", writing, "it celebrates a period when the joy of life was pitted against the forces of intolerance and the death-dealing might of the military–industrial complex.  As Shakespeare once said: 'There's sap in't yet.'" Charles Spencer in The Daily Telegraph agreed: "This is a timely and irresistibly vital revival of the greatest of all rock musicals. ... The verve and energy of the company ... is irresistible." Michael Coveney of The Independent wrote that Hair is "one of the great musicals of all time, and a phenomenon that, I'm relieved to discover, stands up as a period piece". In The Times, Benedict Nightingale commented that "it's exhilarating, as well as oddly poignant, when a multihued cast dressed in everything from billowing kaftans to Ruritanian army jackets race downstage while delivering that tuneful salute to an age of Aquarius that still refuses to dawn."

2014 Hollywood Bowl
In August 2014, the 2009 Broadway version returned for a three-night engagement at the Hollywood Bowl. Directed by Adam Shankman, the cast included Kristen Bell as Sheila, Hunter Parrish as Claude, Benjamin Walker as Berger, Amber Riley as Dionne, Jenna Ushkowitz as Jeanie, Sarah Hyland as Crissy, Mario as Hud, and Beverly D'Angelo and Kevin Chamberlin as Claude's parents.

UK 50th anniversary production and 2019 national tour
A 2016 production in Manchester, England, at the Hope Mill Theatre, directed by Jonathan O'Boyle and choreographed by William Whelton, starring Robert Metson as Claude, Laura Johnson as Sheila and Ryan Anderson as Berger, earned positive reviews. In 2017, the musical's 50th anniversary, the staging was repeated Off West-End at The Vaults theatre in London, with Metson and Johnson repeating their roles and Andy Coxon as Berger. The production won the WhatsOnStage Award for Best Off-West End Production.
A UK national tour of the production began in March 2019, starring Jake Quickenden as Berger, Daisy Wood-Davis as Sheila, Paul Wilkins as Claude and Marcus Collins as Hud.

 International success Hair has been performed in most of the countries of the world.   After the Berlin Wall fell, the show traveled for the first time to Poland, Lebanon, the Czech Republic and Sarajevo (featured on ABC's Nightline with Ted Koppel, when Phil Alden Robinson visited that city in 1996 and discovered a production of Hair there in the midst of the war).  In 1999, Michael Butler and director Bo Crowell helped produce Hair in Russia at the Stas Namin Theatre located in Moscow's Gorky Park.  The Moscow production caused a similar reaction as the original did 30 years earlier because Russian soldiers were fighting in Chechnya at the time.

Rado wrote in 2003 that the only places where the show had not been performed were "China, India, Vietnam, the Arctic and Antarctic continents as well as most African countries."  Since then, an Indian production has been mounted.

 Adaptations 
 Film 

A musical film adaptation of the same name was released in 1979. Directed by Miloš Forman with choreography by Twyla Tharp and a screenplay by Michael Weller, the film stars John Savage, Treat Williams and Beverly D'Angelo, with Golden, Melba Moore, Dyson, Foley, Dorsey Wright, Don Dacus, Nell Carter and Cheryl Barnes. It was nominated for two Golden Globes: Best Motion Picture – Musical or Comedy, and New Star of the Year in a Motion Picture (for Williams), and Forman was nominated for a César Award.

Several songs were deleted, and the film's storyline departs significantly from the musical.  The character of Claude is rewritten as an innocent draftee from Oklahoma, newly arrived in New York to join the military, and Sheila is a high-society debutante who catches his eye. In perhaps the greatest diversion, a mistake leads Berger to go to Vietnam in Claude's place, where he is killed. While the film received generally positive reviews, Ragni and Rado said it failed to capture the essence of Hair by portraying hippies as "oddballs" without any connection to the peace movement.

 Cultural impact 

 Popular culture The New York Times noted, in 2007, that "Hair was one of the last Broadway musicals to saturate the culture as shows from the golden age once regularly did." Songs from the show continue to be recorded by major artists. In 2004 "Aquarius", from the 1979 film version, was honored at number 33 on AFI's 100 Years ... 100 Songs.

Songs from the musical have been featured in films and television episodes.  For example, in the 2005 film Charlie and the Chocolate Factory, the character Willy Wonka welcomed the children with lyrics from "Good Morning Starshine". "Aquarius" was performed in the final episode of Laverne and Shirley in 1983, where the character Carmine moves to New York City to become an actor, and auditions for Hair.  "Aquarius/Let the Sunshine In" was also performed in the final scene in the film The 40-Year-Old Virgin, and Three Dog Night's recording of "Easy to Be Hard" was featured in the first part of David Fincher's film Zodiac. On the Simpsons episode "The Springfield Files", the townspeople, Leonard Nimoy, Chewbacca, Dana Scully and Fox Mulder all sing "Good Morning Starshine". The episode "Hairography" of the show Glee includes a much-criticized mash-up of the songs "Hair" and "Crazy in Love" by Beyoncé. In addition, Head of the Class featured a two-part episode in 1990 where the head of the English department is determined to disrupt the school's performance of Hair. The continued popularity of Hair is seen in its number ten ranking in a 2006 BBC Radio 2 listener poll of the "[United Kingdom]'s Number One Essential Musicals".

Because of the universality of its pacifist theme, Hair continues to be a popular choice for high-school and university productions. Amateur productions of Hair are also popular worldwide. In 2002, Peter Jennings featured a Boulder, Colorado, high school production of Hair for his ABC documentary series In Search of America. A September 2006 community theater production at the 2,000-seat Count Basie Theater in Red Bank, New Jersey, was praised by original producer Michael Butler, who said it was "one of the best Hairs I have seen in a long time."  Another example of a recent large-scale amateur production is the Mountain Play production at the 4,000-seat Cushing Memorial Amphitheatre in Mount Tamalpais State Park in Mill Valley, California, in the spring of 2007.

 Legacy Hair was Broadway's "first fully realized" concept musical, a form that dominated the musical theatre of the seventies, including shows like Company, Follies, Pacific Overtures and A Chorus Line. While the development of the concept musical was an unexpected consequence of Hair tenure on Broadway, the expected rock music revolution on Broadway turned out to be less than complete.

MacDermot followed Hair with three successive rock scores: Two Gentlemen of Verona (1971); Dude (1972), a second collaboration with Ragni; and Via Galactica (1972). While Two Gentlemen of Verona found receptive audiences and a Tony for Best Musical, Dude failed after just sixteen performances, and Via Galactica flopped after a month. According to Horn, these and other such "failures may have been the result of producers simply relying on the label 'rock musical' to attract audiences without regard to the quality of the material presented". Jesus Christ Superstar (1970) and Godspell (1971) were two religiously themed successes of the genre. Grease (1971) reverted to the rock sounds of the 1950s, and black-themed musicals like The Wiz (1975) were heavily influenced by gospel, R&B and soul music. By the late 1970s, the genre had played itself out. Except for a few outposts of rock, like Dreamgirls (1981) and Little Shop of Horrors (1982), audience tastes in the 1980s turned to megamusicals with pop scores, like Les Misérables (1985) and The Phantom of the Opera (1986). Some later rock musicals, such as Rent (1996) and Spring Awakening (2006), as well as jukebox musicals featuring rock music, like We Will Rock You (2002) and Rock of Ages (2009), have found success. But the rock musical did not quickly come to dominate the musical theatre stage after Hair. Critic Clive Barnes commented, "There really weren't any rock musicals. No major rock musician ever did a rock score for Broadway. ...  You might think of the musical Tommy, but it was never conceived as a Broadway show. ... And one can see why. There's so much more money in records and rock concerts. I mean, why bother going through the pain of a musical which may close in Philadelphia?"Subsequent to Barnes' comment, Spider-Man: Turn Off the Dark began performances in 2010, with a rock score by Bono, but the musical suffered a series of mishaps, record expenses and tepid reviews. See, e.g., Pennacchio, George. "Spider-Man musical opens: What critics said". . ABClocal-KABC, June 14, 2011.

On the other hand, Hair had a profound effect not only on what was acceptable on Broadway, but as part of the very social movements that it celebrated. For example, in 1970, Butler, Castelli and the various Hair casts contributed to fundraising for the World Youth Assembly, a United Nations–sponsored organization formed in connection with the celebration of the 25th anniversary of the United Nations. The Assembly enabled 750 young representatives from around the world to meet in New York in July 1970 to discuss social issues."Racusin Keys Trade Youth Drive of UN". . Billboard, June 6, 1970, accessed April 19, 2011 For about a week, cast members worldwide collected donations at every show for the fund.  Hair raised around $250,000 and ended up being the principal financier of the Assembly. Cast and crew members also contributed a day's pay, and Butler contributed a day's profits from these productions. Moreover, as Ellen Stewart, La MaMa's founder, noted:

See also
List of plays with anti-war themes
List of anti-war songs

References
Notes

Bibliography
 Davis, Lorrie and Rachel Gallagher. Letting Down My Hair: Two Years with the Love Rock Tribe (1973) A. Fields Books 
 Horn, Barbara Lee. The Age of Hair: Evolution and the Impact of Broadway's First Rock Musical (New York, 1991) 
 Johnson, Jonathon.  Good Hair Days: A Personal Journey with the American Tribal Love-Rock Musical Hair (iUniverse, 2004) 
 Miller, Scott.  Let the Sun Shine In: The Genius of Hair (Heinemann, 2003) 
 Wollman, Elizabeth Lara, The Theatre Will Rock: A History of the Rock Musical from Hair to Hedwig'' (University of Michigan Press, 2006)

External links 
 
 
 
 The HAIR Archives at Michael Butler.com, curator Nina Machlin Dayton, containing numerous historical documents about the musical
 Official HAIR blog from Michael Butler, the musical's original producer
 Links to discographies and listings of original cast albums and recordings of songs in Hair compiled by John Holleman
 Official Galt MacDermot Hair website
 HAIR Pages (1995–2009 archive)

1967 musicals
Broadway musicals
Hippie movement
Nudity in theatre and dance
Anti-war plays
Counterculture of the 1960s
Off-Broadway musicals
Original musicals
West End musicals
Plays set in New York City
Plays set in the United States
Plays set in the 1960s
Musicals by Galt MacDermot
Sexual revolution
American rock musicals
Tony Award-winning musicals
Obscenity controversies in theatre